No. 155 Helicopter Unit is a helicopter unit equipped with Mil Mi-17V5. It is based at Suratgarh Air Force Station.

History

Assignments

Aircraft
Mil Mi-17V5

References

155